Ebony Naomi Oshunrinde (born December 28, 1996), professionally known as WondaGurl, is a Canadian record producer, songwriter and record executive. WondaGurl has worked with the likes of Mariah Carey, Pop Smoke, Travis Scott, Jay-Z, Drake and Kanye West.

Early life and career
Ebony Naomi Oshunrinde was born on December 28, 1996 at the Scarborough Grace Hospital in Scarborough, Ontario, Canada, to Josefina Oshunrinde. She lived with her mother in North York and Mississauga before eventually setting in Brampton. WondaGurl started producing on her keyboard with drum pads at age 9. At age 15, she entered the 2011 and 2012 Battle of The Beat Makers competition in Toronto, Ontario, where Canadian record producer Boi-1da was present as one of the guest judges at both years. She won first place in the latter year, earning herself a trophy and a Roland SH-01 Gaia synthesizer.

WondaGurl became a protégé of Boi-1da shortly after the competition, and around 2013, started to closely work with American rapper Travis Scott at 16 years old, whom she also signed to years later. She also garnered one of her first high-profile music placements that same year, with rapper Jay-Z on his twelfth studio album Magna Carta Holy Grail, working on the track "Crown" with Travis and record producer Mike Dean. This led to her working with other major artists and producers since then, producing her first Top 40 hit single "Antidote" by Travis Scott in 2015, which was co-produced by Canadian record producer Eestbound. She would soon after go on to sign Eestbound to a production deal at the time, becoming her first co-producer. His deal with her later ended around 2016, leaving them to go their separate ways.

In 2018, she was featured in the Music category of Forbes 30 Under 30. She is one of the youngest women to add production to a platinum-selling hip hop album.

In July 2020, WondaGurl signed a worldwide publishing deal with Travis Scott's Cactus Jack Publishing and Sony/ATV Music Publishing, in conjunction with her own record label and publishing company, Wonderchild Music.

At the Juno Awards of 2021, WondaGurl won the Jack Richardson Producer of the Year Award for her work on the songs "Aim for the Moon" (Pop Smoke feat. Quavo) and "Gang Gang" (JackBoys and Sheck Wes). She was both the first Black Canadian woman to win the award, and the first woman ever to win as a producer for other artists rather than as an artist self-producing her own work.

Production discography

Singles produced

References

External links
 

1996 births
Living people
Black Canadian musicians
Canadian hip hop record producers
Canadian people of Nigerian descent
Women hip hop record producers
Canadian women hip hop musicians
Black Canadian women
Jack Richardson Producer of the Year Award winners
Canadian women record producers
Canadian women songwriters